Antoon "Ton" Schmidt (born January 31, 1948 in Amsterdam) is a former water polo player from the Netherlands, who finished in seventh position with the Netherlands men's national water polo team at the 1972 Summer Olympics in Munich.

References
 Dutch Olympic Committee

External links

1948 births
Living people
Dutch male water polo players
Olympic water polo players of the Netherlands
Water polo players at the 1972 Summer Olympics
Water polo players from Amsterdam
20th-century Dutch people